In mathematics, Dickson's lemma states that every set of -tuples of natural numbers has finitely many minimal elements. This simple fact from combinatorics has become attributed to the American algebraist L. E. Dickson, who used it to prove a result in number theory about perfect numbers. However, the lemma was certainly known earlier, for example to Paul Gordan in his research on invariant theory.

Example

Let  be a fixed number, and let  be the set of pairs of numbers whose product is at least . When defined over the positive real numbers,  has infinitely many minimal elements of the form , one for each positive number ; this set of points forms one of the branches of a hyperbola. However, Dickson's lemma concerns only tuples of natural numbers, and over the natural numbers there are only finitely many minimal pairs.

Formal statement
Let  be the set of non-negative integers (natural numbers), let n be any fixed constant, and let  be the set of -tuples of natural numbers. These tuples may be given a pointwise partial order, the product order, in which  if and only if  for every .
The set of tuples that are greater than or equal to some particular tuple  forms a positive orthant with its apex at the given tuple.

With this notation, Dickson's lemma may be stated in several equivalent forms:
For every infinite sequence  of -tuples of natural numbers, there exist two indices  such that  holds with respect to the pointwise order.
The partially ordered set  does not contain infinite antichains nor infinite (strictly) descending sequences of -tuples.
The partially ordered set  is a well partial order.

Generalizations and applications
Dickson used his lemma to prove that, for any given number , there can exist only a finite number of odd perfect numbers that have at most  prime factors. However, it remains open whether there exist any odd perfect numbers at all.

Thus, for any set S of P-smooth numbers, there is a finite subset of S such that every element of S is divisible by one of the numbers in this subset. This fact has been used, for instance, to show that there exists an algorithm for classifying the winning and losing moves from the initial position in the game of Sylver coinage, even though the algorithm itself remains unknown.

The tuples  in  correspond one-for-one with the monomials  over a set of  variables . Under this correspondence, Dickson's lemma may be seen as a special case of Hilbert's basis theorem stating that every polynomial ideal has a finite basis, for the ideals generated by monomials. Indeed, Paul Gordan used this restatement of Dickson's lemma in 1899 as part of a proof of Hilbert's basis theorem.

See also
Gordan's lemma

Notes

References

Combinatorics
Lemmas
Wellfoundedness